Goran Antonić (Serbian Cyrillic: Горан Антонић; born 3 November 1990) is a Serbian footballer who plays for FK TSC Bačka Topola.

Career

Club
On 5 June 2019, Antonić was released by FC Alashkert.

Statistics

References

External links
 Utakmica profile
 Srbijafudbal profile
 
 

1990 births
Living people
Association football defenders
FK Palić players
FK Spartak Subotica players
Nea Salamis Famagusta FC players
Elverum Fotball players
FC Alashkert players
FK TSC Bačka Topola players
Serbian SuperLiga players
Cypriot First Division players
Norwegian First Division players
Armenian Premier League players
Sportspeople from Sremska Mitrovica
Serbian footballers
Serbian expatriate footballers
Expatriate footballers in Cyprus
Serbian expatriate sportspeople in Cyprus
Expatriate footballers in Norway
Serbian expatriate sportspeople in Norway
Expatriate footballers in Armenia
Serbian expatriate sportspeople in Armenia